Kilbeggan is a civil parish in County Westmeath, Ireland.

Kilbeggan is one of 8 civil parishes in the barony of Moycashel in the Province of Leinster.

Kilbeggan civil parish comprises the town of Kilbeggan and 29 townlands: Aghamore, Aghuldred, Ardnaglew, Ballinderry Big, Ballinderry Little, Ballinwire, Ballymacmorris, Ballynasudder, Ballyoban, Brownscurragh, Camagh, Clonaglin, Coola, Demesne or Mearsparkfarm, Grange and Kiltober, Grangegibbon, Greenan, Guigginstown, Hallsfarm, Kilbeggan, Kilbeggan North, Kilbeggan South, Kiltober and Grange, Loughanagore, Meadowpark, Meeldrum, Meeniska, Meersparkfarm or Demesne, Shureen and Ballynasuddery, Skeahanagh, Stonehousefarm and Tonaphort.

The neighbouring civil parishes are: Castletownkindalen to the north, Newtown to the east, Rahugh to the east and south, Durrow to the south and Ardnurcher or Horseleap  to the west.

References

External links
Kilbeggan civil parish at the IreAtlas Townland Data Base
Kilbeggan civil parish at townlands.ie
Kilbeggan civil parish at The Placenames Database of Ireland

Civil parishes of County Westmeath